A hagioscope (from Gr. άγιος, holy, and σκοπεῖν, to see) or squint is an architectural term denoting a small splayed opening or tunnel at seated eye-level, through an internal masonry dividing wall of a church in an oblique direction (south-east or north-east), giving worshippers a view of the altar and therefore of the elevation of the host. Where worshippers were separated from the high altar not by a solid wall of masonry but by a transparent parclose screen, a hagioscope was not required as a good view of the high altar was available to all within the sectioned-off area concerned. Where a squint was made in an external wall so that lepers and other non-desirables could see the service without coming into contact with the rest of the populace, they are termed leper windows or lychnoscopes.

Function
Where the congregation of a church is united in the nave there is no use for a hagioscope. However, when parts of the congregation separated themselves for purposes of social distinction, by use of walls or other screens from the chancel, or nave, and from the main congregation, such a need arose. In medieval architecture hagioscopes were often a low window in the chancel wall and were frequently protected by either a wooden shutter or iron bars. Hagioscopes are found on one or both sides of the chancel arch; in some cases a series of openings has been cut in the walls in an oblique line to enable a person standing in the porch (as in Bridgwater church, Somerset) to see the altar; in this case and in other instances such openings were sometimes provided for an attendant, who had to ring the Sanctus bell when the Host was elevated.

Though rarely encountered in continental Europe, they are occasionally found to serve such purposes as allowing a monk in one of the vestries to follow the service and to communicate with the bell-ringers. Sometimes squints were placed to enable nuns to observe the services without having to give up their isolation. The unusual design of the church of St Helen's in Bishopsgate, one of the largest surviving ancient churches of London, arose from its once having been two separate places of worship: a 13th-century parish church and the chapel of a Benedictine convent. On the convent side of St Helen's Church, a "squint" allowed the nuns to observe the parish masses; church records show that the squint in this case was not enough to restrain the nuns, who were eventually admonished to "abstain from kissing secular persons", a practice to which it seems they had become "too prone".

Surviving examples

Finland 

There is only one hagioscope in Finland, at Olavinlinna (St. Olaf's Castle), in the town of Savonlinna. Here, the squint has enabled some congregants to continue gathering at the dark, damp stone church tower through the dead of winter, despite forbidding temperatures and weather conditions.

France 
In France, the hagioscope of Notre-Dame in Dives-sur-Mer, Normandy, has the inscription trou aux lépreux (leper window). Other hagioscopes are known at St. Laurent in Deauville, Normandy and at the old church of St. Maurice in Freyming-Merlebach, Lorraine.

Germany 
In Germany, a number of hagioscopes still exist or were rediscovered in the 19th and 20th century. They are found mainly in Lower Saxony which had a small population in the Middle Ages and only a few bigger cities. In cities lepers lived together in housing estates which often had their own chapels. In Georgsmarienhütte the hagioscope of church St. Johann belonged to the former Benedictine convent Kloster Oesede, founded in the 12th century and reconstructed in the early 1980s. Nearby in Bad Iburg a hagioscope was rediscovered at St. Clemens, church of former Benedictine monastery in the castle and monastery complex Schloss Iburg. Other hagioscopes in Lower Saxony are found in Bokelesch, Westoverledingen, Dornum, Midlum, Kirchwahlingen (Gemeinde Böhme) and Hankensbüttel.

In Northrhine-Westphalia, St. Antonius-Kapelle in Gescher-Tungerloh-Capellen has a hagioscope. St. Antonius is used as Autobahn chapel at Bundesautobahn 31. Another hagioscope is found in St. Ulricus in Börninghausen. In Rhineland-Palatinate the church of St. Eligius-Hospital in Neuerburg has a hagioscope. In Baden-Württemberg there is a hagioscope in St. Peter und Paul, the Old Cemetery Church of Nusplingen.

Ireland

A leper's squint (now blocked up) is visible at St Mary's Cathedral, Limerick.
Athenry Priory also once had a leper's squint
Furness Church, 13th century Norman church near Naas
St Mary's Church, Inis Cealtra has a stone opening believed to be a leper's squint

Netherlands 
St. Vitus in Wetsens, and Jistrum, both in Friesland, have hagioscopes, as does the oldest church in the Netherlands, which stands in Oosterbeek.

Sweden 
In Sweden, Bro Church near Visby on Gotland has a cross-shaped hagioscope. Another church on Gotland with a hagioscope is Atlingbo Church. Other hagioscopes are at the church of Vreta Abbey near Linköping, Granhult Kyrka in Uppvidinge and Husaby Kyrka in Götene. The wooden church in Granhult (Småland) has a hagioscope which can be closed.

United Kingdom 
Churches in England with hagioscopes include:

Church of St Mary the Virgin, Gamlingay, Cambridgeshire
St Martin and St Meriadoc's Church, Camborne, Cornwall
St Wynwallow's Church, Landewednack, Cornwall
St Martin's Church, Liskeard, Cornwall
 St Anietus's Church, St Neot, Cornwall
St Corentin's Church, Cury, Cornwall
Church of St Mylor, Mylor, Cornwall
St Martin's Church, St Martin-by-Looe, Cornwall
St Cyricius and St Julietta's Church, St Veep, Cornwall
Church of St Sampson, South Hill, Cornwall
Stoke Climsland Church, Cornwall
St Petroc's Church, Trevalga, Cornwall
 St James' in Great Ormside, Cumbria
 St Bees Priory, St Bees, Cumbria (now infilled)
 St Mary's Bridge Chapel, Derby
 St Mary's, Lytchett Matravers, Dorset (a particularly large example)
 St Martin's Church in Wareham, Dorset
 St Mary and St Cuthbert, Chester-le-Street, Durham
 St Mary's Church, Easington, County Durham
 St Thomas à Becket Church, Lewes, East Sussex
 St Nicholas' Church, Berden, Essex
 St. Laurence and All Saints Church, Eastwood, Essex
 St Andrew and St Bartholomew's Church, Ashleworth, Gloucestershire
 St Nicholas's Church, Westgate Street, Gloucester, Gloucestershire
 Church of the Holy Rood, Holybourne, Hampshire
St Mary's Church, Brook, Kent
 St Cuthbert's Church, Aldingham, Lancashire
 St Cuthbert's Church, Halsall, Lancashire has six purposeful squints or hagioscopes including a double one in the chancel arch and a remarkable triple hagioscope which was built for exclusive viewing of the Easter Sepulchre during Holy Week.
 St Wilfrid's church, Ribchester, Lancashire has a squint on the north side permitting the high altar to be viewed from outside the church.* St Nicholas's Church, Walcot, Lincolnshire
 St James The Less, Sulgrave, Northamptonshire
 St Mary's Church, Grendon, Northamptonshire (see picture in Gallery)
 St Cuthbert's Church, Beltingham, Northumberland
 St Aidan's Church, Bamburgh, Northumberland
 Church of St Andrew, Grinton, North Yorkshire
 St Oswald's Church, Sowerby, North Yorkshire
 Holy Trinity Church, Goodramgate, York, North Yorkshire
 St Mary's Church, Whitby, North Yorkshire
 St Peter's in Upton, Nottinghamshire
 St Nicholas's Church, Old Marston, Oxfordshire
Church of the Blessed Virgin Mary, Compton Pauncefoot, Somerset
 St Mary's Church, West Chiltington, West Sussex
 St Mary the Virgin & St Chad, Brewood, Staffordshire
 Orford Castle's chapel, Suffolk
 The Church of St. James, Shere, Surrey
 St Nicholas' Church, Kenilworth, Warwickshire
St Mary's Church, West Chiltington, West Sussex
 Holy Trinity Church, Bradford-on-Avon, Wiltshire
 St Egwin's, Norton and Lenchwick, north of Evesham, Worcestershire (now infilled)
 St Mary's Church in Winchcombe, Gloucestershire

At St Bees Priory a purpose-built squint was included in the wall of the 14th-century chapel to give a view of the high altar. The window was low enough to allow a person to kneel whilst looking through the aperture. The hagioscope at St Mary the Virgin, Lytchett Matravers, is unusually large; although unknown in origin it provides a view to the communion table from the 16th-century north aisle. It is large enough that it is often used as a corridor for access to the chancel.

Gallery

References 

Windows
Architectural elements
Church architecture